Vladimir Pavlovich Andriejczenko (Belarusian: Уладзімір Паўлавіч Андрэйчанка) (Russian: Владимир Павлович Андрейченко) (born 1949) is a Belarusian agronomist and politician who has been Chair of the House of Representatives since October 2008.

Career 
In 2019, he attended the 18th Summit of the Non-Aligned Movement.

References 

1949 births
Living people
Communist Party of Byelorussia politicians
20th-century Belarusian politicians
21st-century Belarusian politicians
Members of the House of Representatives of Belarus
Belarusian agronomists